What Is There to Say (or more completely, What Is There to Say: Joe Pass Solo Guitar) is a live album by jazz guitarist Joe Pass, recorded in 1990 and released posthumously in 2001.

Track listing
 "Django" (John Lewis) – 5:02
 "Old Folks" (Willard Robison, Dedette Lee Hill) – 4:13
 "I Concentrate on You" (Cole Porter) – 4:04
 "I'll Be Around" (Alec Wilder) – 5:01
 "They Can't Take That Away from Me" (George Gershwin, Ira Gershwin) – 4:02
 "Medley: It's All in the Game/Yesterdays" (Carl Sigman, Charles Dawes, Otto Harbach, Jerome Kern) – 6:29
 "Come Rain or Come Shine" (Harold Arlen, Johnny Mercer) – 4:30
 "On Green Dolphin Street" (Bronisław Kaper, Ned Washington) – 7:01
 "What Is There to Say?" (Vernon Duke, E. Y. "Yip" Harburg) – 6:44
 "Nobody Else But Me" (Oscar Hammerstein II, Jerome Kern) – 5:17
 "Lush Life" (Billy Strayhorn) – 7:15

Personnel
 Joe Pass – guitar

References

Joe Pass live albums
Live albums published posthumously
2001 live albums
Pablo Records live albums